William Saunders (December 7, 1822 – September 11, 1900) was a botanist, nurseryman, landscape gardener, landscape designer, and horticulturist. As the chief experimental horticulturalist in the US, he was responsible for the introduction of many fruits and vegetables to American agriculture; with seven others he founded the National Grange of the Order of Patrons of Husbandry,  a fraternal organization in the United States.

Grange
William Saunders was born in Saint Andrews, Scotland. He served as the first Master (President) of the National Grange. He was a founder of the National Grange of the Order of Patrons of Husbandry.  The other founders of the Grange were Oliver Hudson Kelley, Francis M. McDowell, John Trimble, Aaron B. Grosh, John R. Thompson, William M. Ireland and Caroline A. Hall.

Botany and design
He was the U.S. Department of Agriculture's first botanist and landscape designer. Saunders had been previously appointed to Superintendent of the Propagating Gardens in the Department of Agriculture, where he developed hundreds of plants, trees and shrubs that are grown throughout the United States.

An ardent botanist, he designed the cemetery at Gettysburg, for which the Gettysburg Address was written by President Lincoln as a dedication ode to those interred there. Saunders designed the park system in Washington, D.C., and oversaw the planting of 80,000 trees in the city.

Navel Orange
He was crucial in the introduction of the seedless Navel Orange to California agriculture, by mailing three trees from Bahia, Brazil in the Department of Agriculture collection to farmer and friend Eliza Tibbets in Riverside County, Southern California. They were the basis of the state's successful 20th century citrus industry. One of two remaining original trees stands in the Mission Inn courtyard in downtown Riverside.

References

External links
 "William Saunders", The New York Times, (September 14, 1900), p. 6.
 The Founders of the Grange
 
 

American landscape and garden designers
1822 births
1900 deaths
Botanists active in North America
Botanists with author abbreviations
Scottish botanists
American landscape architects
United States Department of Agriculture
People from St Andrews
National Grange of the Order of Patrons of Husbandry
Oranges (fruit)
19th-century American botanists